Independence constitution is the name commonly given by African political scientists to originating constitutions (many of which are extant) of former British colonies, primarily in Africa, which gained their independence approximately 1960-1990. 

Due to these colonies' low economic output and the United Kingdom's fading imperial prowess, independence was usually granted after little instigation, with the UK presiding over creation of the new state. Generally local leaders were hand-picked by the UK to be the new governing body and were given a political education in London, during which they often served as the sole representative of their country in the negotiation of their country's new constitution. In short, independence constitutions were written in London, by a primarily British body, in line with British systems of governance. Supporters applaud the UK's responsible transfer of power; critics cite low popular perceptions of legitimacy and claim that the independence constitutions maintained essentially colonial states.

See also
British Empire
Colonialism

Constitutional law
British Empire